Mucking Flats and Marshes is a 311.6 biological Site of Special Scientific Interest east of Tilbury in Essex. It is part of the Thames Estuary and Marshes Ramsar site. and Special Protection Area

The site is an extensive stretch of mudflats, saltmarsh and the sea wall, on the eastern side of the River Thames. Wildfowl and waders feed and roost on the site, with internationally important numbers of ringed plover, and nationally significant shelducks, grey plovers, dunlins, black-tailed godwits and redshanks. Plants include the nationally scarce golden samphire, and invertebrates the rare spider baryphyma duffeyi.

The Thames Estuary Path goes through the site.

References

Special Protection Areas in England
Sites of Special Scientific Interest in Essex
Ramsar sites in England